The 1934 United States House of Representatives elections in South Carolina were held on November 6, 1934 to select six Representatives for two-year terms from the state of South Carolina.  All six incumbents were re-elected and the composition of the state delegation remained solely Democratic.

1st congressional district
Incumbent Democratic Congressman Thomas S. McMillan of the 1st congressional district, in office since 1925, defeated Republican challenger George W. Beckett.

General election results

|-
| 
| colspan=5 |Democratic hold
|-

2nd congressional district
Incumbent Democratic Congressman Hampton P. Fulmer of the 2nd congressional district, in office since 1921, won the Democratic primary and defeated Republican D.A. Gardner in the general election.

Democratic primary

General election results

|-
| 
| colspan=5 |Democratic hold
|-

3rd congressional district
Incumbent Democratic Congressman John C. Taylor of the 3rd congressional district, in office since 1933, defeated Leon W. Harris in the Democratic primary and Republican T. Frank McCord in the general election.

Democratic primary

General election results

|-
| 
| colspan=5 |Democratic hold
|-

4th congressional district
Incumbent Democratic Congressman John J. McSwain of the 4th congressional district, in office since 1921, won the Democratic primary and defeated Republican Frank W. Faux in the general election.

Democratic primary

General election results

|-
| 
| colspan=5 |Democratic hold
|-

5th congressional district
Incumbent Democratic Congressman James P. Richards of the 5th congressional district, in office since 1933, won the Democratic primary and defeated Republican C.F. Pendleton in the general election.

Democratic primary

General election results

|-
| 
| colspan=5 |Democratic hold
|-

6th congressional district
Incumbent Democratic Congressman Allard H. Gasque of the 6th congressional district, in office since 1923, won the Democratic primary and defeated Republican T.J. Karnes in the general election.

Democratic primary

General election results

|-
| 
| colspan=5 |Democratic hold
|-

See also
United States House of Representatives elections, 1934
South Carolina gubernatorial election, 1934
South Carolina's congressional districts

References

"Supplemental Report of the Secretary of State to the General Assembly of South Carolina." Reports of State Officers Boards and Committees to the General Assembly of the State of South Carolina. Volume I. Columbia, SC: 1935, pp. 4–6.

South Carolina
1934
1934 South Carolina elections